Gonzalo Calveiro (born 1 December 1971) is an Uruguayan former basketball player.

References

1971 births
Living people
Basketball players at the 1995 Pan American Games
Pan American Games competitors for Uruguay
Uruguayan men's basketball players
1963 FIBA World Championship players
Place of birth missing (living people)
20th-century Uruguayan people